Amanda Thompson may refer to:

 Amanda Thompson (basketball) (born 1987), American basketball player
 Amanda Thompson (businesswoman) (born 1962), owner of Blackpool Pleasure Beach